Gokalgarh is a village Near Hanuman Mandir Astal in Rewari block, in the Indian state of Haryana.

Railway Station
It has a railway station from Rewari, It is first on Rewari-Rohtak line.

Demographics of 2011
As of 2011 India census, Gokalgarh is a large village with total 12750 families residing. The Gokalgarh village has population of 6331 of which 3341 are males while 2990 are females as per Population Census 2011. 
In Gokalgarh village population of children with age 0-6 is 762 which makes up 12.04% of total population of village. Average Sex Ratio of Gokalgarh village is 895 which is higher than Haryana state average of 879. Child Sex Ratio for the Gokalgarh as per census is 736, lower than Haryana average of 834.

Gokalgarh village has higher literacy rate compared to Haryana. In 2011, literacy rate of Gokalgarh village was 81.88% compared to 75.55% of Haryana. In Gokalgarh Male literacy stands at 93.49% while female literacy rate was 69.25%.

As per constitution of India and Panchyati Raaj Act, Gokalgarh village is administrated by Sarpanch (Head of Village) who is elected representative of village.

Adjacent villages
Mastapur
Guraora
Kulana
Lisana
Bikaner

References

Villages in Rewari district